Emlak Konut is a Turkish real estate developer, belonging to TOKI the Housing Development Administration of Turkey, an arm of the Turkish state.

History
Emlak Konut was formed in 1987 as a subsidiary of Emlak Bank, from property developer Ankara İmar Ltd, which had been founded in 1953. The company specialised in housing projects throughout Turkey. In 2002, with the liquidation of the failed Emlak Bank, ownership of the property company passed to TOKI, but Emlak Konut has remained profitable without need of further subsidy from TOKI.
In 2010 shares in Emlak Konut were offered on the Istanbul Stock Exchange.

References

External links
www.emlakkonut.com.tr

Companies of Turkey